The Rogožarski AŽR (Serbian Cyrillic:Рогожарски АЖР) was a single-engined, two-seat biplane aircraft designed as a trainer in Yugoslavia before World War II. It was designed and built at the Rogožarski factory in Belgrade.

Design and development
William Schuster, a flight engineer, designed the AŽR at the end of 1929. The first test flight of the prototype was conducted by a factory test pilot on 5 November 1930. The aircraft was a biplane with the lower wing smaller than the upper. It was equipped with a seven-cylinder Walter Castor air-cooled radial engine of 240 hp and a wooden double-bladed propeller. The plane had dual controls, the two crew (pilot and flight instructor), sat one behind the other. It was to be employed as an intermediate trainer, replacing the outdated Hansa-Brandenburg C.I. The fuselage, which was of rectangular cross-section, was made of wood and covered with plywood. The wings had rounded ends, each was connected by a pair of metal struts and wire tensioners. Construction of the wing involved the use of wood covered with canvas. The landing gear was fixed and had no axle.

Operational history
After the completion of factory tests, the aircraft was examined by the Yugoslav Royal Air Force Commission but it did not allow mass production due to a number of perceived shortcomings in the machines' handling. The aircraft was only used in 1931 for advertising purposes, demonstration flights and participation in air shows. It also competed in the King's Cup and the like; AZR still hoped to come to some arrangement with the military. This did not happen, Rogozarski withdrew from aircraft design, the prototype was registered as a civilian plane and used by the factory. It received the civil registration UN-PAU. In the meantime, the economic situation was such that the AŽR was standing in its hangar, waiting for better days; despite bank loans, there was a distinct lack of orders and the company went bankrupt in 1933.

Circumstances improved in the summer of 1934 when the Yugoslav Air Force bought the AZR and the fortunes of the factory improved, becoming a shareholder company. The AŽR was used as a trainer until 1937.

Operators

Royal Yugoslav Air Force 1 aircraft

Specifications

See also

Notes

References

 Gunston, Bill. World Encyclopedia of Aero Engines. Cambridge, England. Patrick Stephens Limited, 1989. 
 Јанић, Чедомир (април 2000.). "Рогожарски АЖР". Аеромагазин 17: стр. 34. ISSN 1450-6068.
 Д. Лучић: Основи практичне аеродинамике са описима аероплана, Библиотека „Ваздухопловног Гласника“, Нови Сад, 1936,
 О. Петровић., Војни аероплани Краљевине СХС/Југославије (Део II: 1931–1941.), Лет 3/2004. Београд, 2004.
 С. Микић; Историја југословенског ваздухопловства, Штампарија Драг. Грегорић, Београд, 1933.

External links

https://web.archive.org/web/20120219070818/http://www.goldenyears.ukf.net/

AZR
1930s Yugoslav military aircraft
Trainer aircraft
Biplanes
Single-engined tractor aircraft